Pedram Sharifi (born August 2, 1987) is an Iranian actor. He gained recognition after portraying Peyman Sabouri in the romance mystery drama The Accomplice (2020). Sharifi earned a Fajr Film Festival Award nomination for his performance in Majority (2021). He is also known for his acting in Born in 1987 (2016), When the Moon Was Full (2019) and I Want to Live (2021).

Filmography

Film

Web

Television

References

External links 

 
Iranian male film actors
People from Tehran
Living people
1987 births